Persatuan Sepakbola Biak dan Sekitarnya, commonly known as PSBS Biak, is an Indonesian football club based in Biak Numfor Regency, Papua, Indonesia. The club currently plays in Liga 2.

History
PSBS Biak was established in 1968, PSBS Biak gait was not as fortunate as other Papuan clubs such as Persipura Jayapura, Persidafon Dafonsoro, Persiwa Wamena, Perseman Manokwari, Perseru Serui, Persiram Raja Ampat, and Persewar Waropen. They just promoted to Premier Division in the 2011–12 season after winning the Liga Indonesia First Division in the 2010 Liga Indonesia First Division.

For eight seasons surviving in the second tier competition, PSBS Biak had to be overtaken by rival, Persewar Waropen, who successfully made history by qualifying for the Second Round of 2019 Liga 2.

Players

Current squad

Supporters

Supporters
PSBS's supporters are called Napi Bongkar. Founded in 2020 with yellow and green as their identity. Napi Bongkar is one of the biggest football club supporters in Papua.

Coaching Staff

Honours
 Liga Indonesia First Division
 Champions: 2010–11 (promotion to Premier Division)

References

External links
Profile at Liga-Indonesia.co.id

 
Football clubs in Indonesia
Football clubs in Papua (province)
Association football clubs established in 1968
1968 establishments in Indonesia